Marinarozelotes is a genus of ground spiders first described by A. V. Ponomarev and V. Y. Shmatko in 2020. The type species, Marinarozelotes barbatus, was originally described under the name "Melanophora barbata".

Species
 it contains twenty  two species:
M. achaemenes Zamani, Chatzaki, Esyunin & Marusik, 2021 – Iran
M. adriaticus (Caporiacco, 1951) – Portugal, Italy to China
M. ansimensis (Seo, 2002) – Korea
M. baiyuensis (Xu, 1991) – China
M. barbatus (L. Koch, 1866) (type) – Mediterranean to Caucasus. Introduced to USA
M. bardiae (Caporiacco, 1928) – Mediterranean
M. chybyndensis (Tuneva & Esyunin, 2002) – Russia (Europe), Kazakhstan
M. cumensis (Ponomarev, 1979) – Ukraine, Russia (Europe), Azerbaijan, Kazakhstan
M. fuscipes (L. Koch, 1866) – Mediterranean, Iran, Kazakhstan, Uzbekistan, China
M. glossus (Strand, 1915) – Turkey, Israel
M. holosericeus (Simon, 1878) – Mediterranean
M. huberti (Platnick & Murphy, 1984) – Algeria, Italy, Albania
M. jaxartensis (Kroneberg, 1875) – Northern Africa to Caucasus, Russia (Europe) to Central Asia, Iran. Introduced to Hawaii, USA, Mexico, South Africa, India, China, Japan
M. kulczynskii (Bösenberg, 1902) – North Macedonia, Bulgaria. Introduced to USA, Caribbean, Colombia, Brazil, Japan, Samoa
M. lyonneti (Audouin, 1826) – Macaronesia, Mediterranean to Central Asia. Introduced to USA, Mexico, Peru, Brazil
M. malkini (Platnick & Murphy, 1984) – Romania, Albania, North Macedonia, Bulgaria, Greece, Ukraine, Russia (Europe, Caucasus), Turkey, Iran, Kazakhstan
M. manytchensis (Ponomarev & Tsvetkov, 2006) – Ukraine, Russia (Europe)
M. miniglossus (Levy, 2009) – Israel, Iran
M. minutus (Crespo, 2010) – Portugal
M. mutabilis (Simon, 1878) – Mediterranean, Romania
M. ravidus (L. Koch, 1875) – Ethiopia
M. stubbsi (Platnick & Murphy, 1984) – Greece, Cyprus, Israel

See also
 Trachyzelotes
 Zelotes
 List of Gnaphosidae species

References

Further reading

Gnaphosidae genera
Cosmopolitan spiders